Pehlivanlı is a village in the Cide District of Kastamonu Province in Turkey. Its population is 89 (2021).

References

Villages in Cide District